Coleotechnites huntella is a moth of the family Gelechiidae. It is found in North America, where it has been recorded from California and Oregon.

The wingspan is 14–15 mm. The forewings are white, irrorated with light fuscous. The hindwings are light grey.

The larvae feed on the flower buds of Rhododendron occidentale and Rhododendron californicum. Full-grown larvae reach a length of about 10 mm. They have a red or purplish-red body.

References

Moths described in 1936
Coleotechnites